L-allo-threonine aldolase (GLY1) is an enzyme catalyzing the conversion between L-allothreonine (unusual stereoisomer)  on one side and glycine plus acetaldehyde on another side. Artificial disabling (knockout) of this enzyme in wild bacteria has no significant effect. However such disabling suppresses the growth of mutants that already lack other enzyme, serine hydroxymethyltransferase. Hence L-allo-threonine aldolase provides the alternative pathway for cellular glycine when serine hydroxymethyltransferase is inert. E.coli L-allo-threonine aldolase is a highly termostable enzyme (survives 60 degrees C), this can be used for purification.

The enzyme is specific for L-allothreonine and can not act on the more common L-threonine.

This enzyme may also present in animals and plants, including mouse.

References 

EC 4.1.2